Michael Rapoport (born 2 October 1948) is an Austrian mathematician.

Career
Rapoport received his PhD from Paris-Sud 11 University in 1976, under the supervision of Pierre Deligne. He  held a chair for arithmetic algebraic geometry at the University of Bonn, as well as a visiting appointment at the University of Maryland. In 1992, he was awarded the Gottfried Wilhelm Leibniz Prize, in 1999 he won the Gay-Lussac Humboldt Prize, and he is the recipient of the 2011 Heinz Hopf Prize. In 1994, he was an Invited Speaker (with talk Non-Archimedean period domains) at the ICM in Zürich.

Rapoport's students include Maria Heep-Altiner, Werner Baer, Peter Scholze, Eva Viehmann.

Personal life
Michael Rapoport is the son of pediatrician Ingeborg Rapoport and biochemist Samuel Mitja Rapoport, and brother of biochemist Tom Rapoport.

Selected  publications
 
 
 
 
 
 with M. Richartz: On the classification and specialization of F-isocrystals with additional structure. In: Composito Mathematica 103(1996), no. 2, pp. 153–182.

References

External links
 Homepage in Bonn
 Oberwolfach Photo Collection, Details for Michael Rapoport
 

1948 births
Living people
Arithmetic geometers
20th-century German mathematicians
Paris-Sud University alumni
Academic staff of the University of Bonn